The Boeing Condor is a high-tech test-bed piston-engined aerial reconnaissance unmanned aerial vehicle with a wingspan of over .

Carbon-fibre composite materials make up the bulk of the Condor's fuselage and wings. Although the Condor has a relatively low radar cross-section and infrared signature, it is not unobservable, making it too vulnerable for military use.

The Condor is completely robotic, with an onboard computer to communicate with the computers on the ground via satellite to control all facets of the Condor's missions. The Condor's frame is made of mainly carbon-fiber-reinforced polymer composite, with very low radar and heat signatures.

It also set an unofficial endurance world record in 1988 by flying continuously for more than 50 hours, though the flight was not ratified by the Fédération Aéronautique Internationale (FAI) and is therefore not considered an official record.

During its evaluations, the Condor logged over 300 flight hours, flying over Moses Lake, Washington.

Survivors
The first flight article is now on display in the Hiller Aviation Museum in San Carlos, California and the second is disassembled at the USAF Museum's restoration centre in Dayton OH.

Specifications

References

External links

Condor Unmanned Aerial Vehicle, Boeing
The Condor, Hiller Aviation Museum
Aviation Trivia

1980s United States experimental aircraft
Condor
Unmanned military aircraft of the United States
High-wing aircraft
Twin piston-engined tractor aircraft
Aircraft first flown in 1988